Clara Gertrud Wichmann, also known as Clara Meijer-Wichmann (17 August 1885 – 15 February 1922) was a German–Dutch lawyer, writer, anarcho-syndicalist, feminist and atheist.

Life 

Although she was born in Hamburg, Clara Wichmann spent most of her life in the Netherlands. She was the daughter of Arthur Wichmann, a university professor in mineralogy and geology and of Johanna Theresa Henriette Zeise (1852–1938) as well as the sister of the artist Erich Wichmann (1890−1929). In 1902 she studied philosophy and Georg Wilhelm Friedrich Hegel's works. Between 1903 and 1905 she studied law.

As a student, Clara Wichmann was active in the feminist movement and took part in Comité Misdaad en Straf in which Hendrik Ebo Kaspers was also involved. She was active in the feminist movement since 1908 and became an anarchist in 1918. In 1917, she met Jonas "Jo" Benjamin Meijer (1895–1969), whom she married in 1921. Meijer refused to serve in the First World War and was sent to jail. During this time Wichmann wrote him many letters. Wichmann and Meijer were close friends with Albert de Jong, a Dutch anarchist, and Bart de Ligt (with whom she and others formed the 'Bond van Revolutionair Socialistische Intellectuelen' in 1919). 

She was very active in the anarchist, anti-militarist and feminist movements, primarily through her publications. She also wrote many articles which were hugely critical of the criminal justice system. She first wrote on this subject in 1912 in her dissertation called 'Beschouwingen over de historische grondslagen der tegenwoordige omvorming van het strafbegrip' (Leiden, 1912). In this she advocated abolishing the idea of punitive justice as a guiding principle of criminal law. In 1919 she created the 'Committee action against the existing conceptions of Crime and Punishment'. On 21 March 1920 she gave her most famous talk on "Crime, punishment and society'. In this lecture she put forth the proposition that crime comes from social injustice, and that she believed most 'crime' would disappear with equitable social relations.

Legacy 

Clara Wichmann died aged 36, a few hours after giving birth to her daughter Hetty Clara Passchier-Meijer (1922–2012). Jo Meijer continued to publish her work after her death and wrote a 'sketch' on her life. Though an atheist, he was Jewish by birth and survived the Second World War by going into hiding in Amsterdam. Hetty Clara survived the war and helped hide a Jewish family in Leiden whilst working with the resistance. After the war she became a doctor and until her death remained actively involved in the publishing and archiving of her mother's work. The 'Clara Wichmann Institute' (1987–2004), that advocated women's rights, was named after her. A book on her life called Passie voor vrijheid by Ellie Smolenaars was published in Amsterdam in 2005.

Bibliography 

 Vrouw en Maatschappij. Verlag Bijleveld, Utrecht 1936
 Mensch en Maatschappij. Uitgevers Maatschappij van Loghum Slaterus en Visser, Arnhem 1923
 Bevrijding. Uitgevers Maatschappij van Loghum Slaterus en Visser, Arnhem 1924
 Die Grausamkeit der herrschenden Auffassung über Verbrechen und Strafe. Verlag Der freie Arbeiter, 1922

References

1885 births
1922 deaths
Anarcha-feminists
Anarchist theorists
Anarcho-syndicalists
Dutch anarchists
Dutch atheists
Dutch feminists
20th-century Dutch lawyers
Dutch writers
German emigrants to the Netherlands
Socialist feminists